The Petite rivière à Monfette (in English: Little river at Monfette) is a tributary on the north bank of the Nicolet Southwest River (Les Trois Lacs (Les Sources). It flows into the municipality of Saint-Rémi-de-Tingwick, in the Arthabaska Regional County Municipality (MRC), in the administrative region of Centre-du-Québec, in Quebec, in Canada.

Geography 
The "Petite rivière à Monfette" has its source at the confluence of two streams on the southern flank of the mount "La Montagne" in Saint-Rémi-de-Tingwick.

From its source, the course of the river descends the mountain towards the south to the confluence (altitude: 260 m) of a stream (coming from the northeast, or from the hamlet of Coin-de-la-Petite-Mine), then continue down the mountain to the north shore of the lake Les Trois Lacs (Les Sources), either in the hamlet of La Petite-Venise and opposite the hamlet of Le Cap-de-Roche (located on the south shore of the lake).

The Les Trois Lacs (Les Sources) is crossed to the west by the Nicolet Southwest River.

Toponymy 
The term "Monfette" turns out to be a family name of French origin.

The toponym "Petite rivière à Monfette" was made official on September 5, 1985, at the Commission de toponymie du Québec.

See also 
 List of rivers of Quebec

References 

Rivers of Centre-du-Québec
Arthabaska Regional County Municipality